"Drake Would Love Me" is an R&B song recorded by American singer K. Michelle for her second studio album, Anybody Wanna Buy a Heart? (2014). It was written by Michelle and Bianca Atterberry. Its music and production came from Oak Felder, Ronald "Flippa" Colson, and Stephen Mostyn. Atlantic Records initially released the song via streaming on VH1's website on December 2, 2014, before it became available with the rest of the album the following week.

The song concerns an imaginary romance with Canadian rapper Drake. Described by critics as fan fiction, it was inspired by Michelle's perception of how Drake's female fans responded to him. The title attracted attention when the album's track listing was announced the month before its release. Several critics praised "Drake Would Love Me" and highlighted Michelle's humor, but others criticized her decision to dedicate a love song to Drake.

Background and release 

Kimberly Michelle Pate wrote "Drake Would Love Me" with Bianca Atterberry  for Anybody Wanna Buy a Heart?, her second studio album. Ronald "Flippa" Colson, Oak Felder, and Stephen Mostyn were in charge of the music. While in the recording studio, Michelle heard women idolizing Canadian rapper Drake and recorded the song as a response. She was also inspired by how Drake's fans fantasize that he would fall in love with them. When asked about Drake's popularity, she responded that he was humble, released more love songs than other men, and was especially respectful to women in his music. Drake's appeal with women has been discussed by media outlets. According to a 2010 Spin article, Drake had "opened up an enormous young female fanbase" early in his rap career, and Much's Andi Crawford and Brianne James attributed the reason women respond to his music to his "delicate tempos and emotionally charged lyrics".

Although much of Michelle's music is autobiographical, she clarified in a 2014 interview with The Breakfast Club that she only had a platonic relationship with Drake. Before its release, she played the song to Drake to obtain his approval; he responded: "You’re crazy as shit, but it’s a great record." While the track is about Drake, Michelle said her relationship with ex-boyfriend Idris Elba was the primary inspiration for the album.

Felder, Colson, and Steve Ace produced the song. Michelle's vocals were recorded by C Travis Kr8ts and produced by Atterberry, with assistance from Felder. Donnie Meadows and Tanisha Broadwater were the production coordinators for the song. The track was mixed by Jaycen Joshua, with assistance from Maddox Chhim and Ryan Kaul, and it was mastered by David Kutch.

When the album's track listing was unveiled on November 3, 2014, media outlets identified "Drake Would Love Me" as a point of interest due to its title. The song debuted via streaming on VH1's website on December 2, 2014, and Atlantic Records released it as a part of Anybody Wanna Buy a Heart? a week later. Michelle uploaded the song to her YouTube account on February 13, 2017, as part of an Anybody Wanna Buy a Heart? playlist.

Music and lyrics 

"Drake Would Love Me" is a four-minute, 19-second R&B song, performed in the style of a ballad and a slow jam. The piano-driven track opens with a melody that MTV News' Rob Markman characterizes as soothing; as it progresses, guitar licks and violins are incorporated into the instrumentation.

The song's lyrics describe an imagined romance with Drake. The situations mentioned include Michelle attending the Grammy Awards with Drake and her being hated by his groupies. Based on this lyrical content, critics associate "Drake Would Love Me" with fan fiction. Time's Nolan Feeney jokingly says it is restrained compared to Amanda Bynes' tweet about wanting Drake to "murder [her] vagina". In the lyrics "Drake wouldn't leave me, he would keep me, never break his promises / I'd be the best he ever had, he'd be on his best behavior / He would make me so proud / Drake would love me", Michelle references the titles of Drake's singles "Best I Ever Had", "Worst Behavior", and "Make Me Proud". According to a Music Times contributor, the lyrics represent how Drake's music often focuses on emotional subject matters. Michelle lists Drake's positive attributes, singing he would "always be the same" and "play no games" and would not lie or make her cry; Feeney compares the rhyme scheme for these lyrics to the writing style of Dr. Seuss.

The album's final three songs ("Build a Man", "Drake Would Love Me", and "God I Get It") are interpreted by critics as forming a story on Michelle's ideas on love. Describing the songs as Michelle's attempt to "reconcile her need to love hard with the reality of the men she encountered", The Quietus writer Alex Macpherson says she turns to Frankenstein and fan fiction for answers on love in "Build a Man" and "Drake Would Love Me" before accepting her own flaws in "God I Get It". Renowned for Sound's Meggie Morris identifies "Drake Would Love Me" as a continuation of "Build a Man" as both explore her perceptions of the perfect man. While The Boston Globe's Ken Capobianco writes that "Drake Would Love Me" represented the album's "honesty, defiance, and sensuality", Emily Laurence of Metro New York singles it out as an example that "not all the songs are intensely emotion-filled".

Critical reception 
Several reviewers enjoyed "Drake Would Love" even though it differed from their initial expectations. In USA Today, Martín Caballero wrote "don't ask us how or why [but the song] works"; he praised it as an "anthemic big-stadium R&B ballad". Although he expected something "funny or cocky", A.D. Amorosi, writing for The Philadelphia Inquirer, highlighted the track for its focus instead on unrequited love. Other critics believed said the song displayed Michelle's humor. In the Ottawa Citizen, Mesfin Fekadu said she was "clever and hilarious", and Meggie Morris described her performance as "charmingly amusing". Ken Capobianco commended Michelle for emoting a level of "vulnerability and rubbed-raw tension rarely heard in R&B today", which he considered a reason for her popularity. Pitchfork's Alfred Soto praised "Drake Would Love Me" for its sense of urgency, and believed it had her best vocals.

The Washington Post's Chris Richards thought it was "mildly radioactive" for Michelle to release a track explicitly about a crush on another singer. In Jezebel, Kara Brown also professed being uncomfortable about the track, panning it as the "musical equivalent of trying to stop your friend from sending a third drunk text to that guy she kinda hooked up with a month ago". Brown said the lyrics adhere more to Drake's image as the ideal boyfriend than his actual behavior toward women. Drake has received criticism from some media outlets for his music being misogynistic and for his interactions with girls. Michael Arceneaux, while writing for Complex, said listeners would recognize the song's idealization of Drake as false, and while he praised Michelle's vocals, he described her as sounding too much like a fan. In The Fader, a writer described the track as "just plain weird" and "saccharine sonic fan-fiction".

Credits and personnel 
Credits were adapted from the liner notes from Anybody Wanna Buy A Heart?:

 Kimberly Pate – lyricist
 Bianca Atterberry – lyricist, vocal production
 Donnie Meadows – production coordination
 Tanisha Broadwater – production coordination
 Oak Felder – production, music, additional recording
 Ronald "Flippa" Colson – production, music

 Stephen Mostyne – production, music
 C Travis Kr8ts – recording
 Jaycen Joshua – mixing
 Maddox Chhim – mixing assistantance
 Ryan Kaul – mixing assistantance
 David Kutch – mastering

References

External links 
 

2010s ballads
2014 songs
Contemporary R&B ballads
Cultural depictions of hip hop musicians
Drake (musician)
K. Michelle songs
Songs about musicians
Songs written by K. Michelle
Songs written by Oak Felder
Song recordings produced by Oak Felder
Songs written by Bianca Atterberry